Guillaume Merckx (born 21 April 1918) is a former Belgian basketball player. He competed in the men's tournament at the 1936 Summer Olympics.

References

External links
 

1918 births
Possibly living people
Belgian men's basketball players
Olympic basketball players of Belgium
Basketball players at the 1936 Summer Olympics
Place of birth missing